The Kwazá (or Coaiá, Koaiá, Koaya, Kwaza, and Quaiá) are an indigenous people of Brazil. Most Kwazá live with the Aikanã and Latundê in the Tubarão-Latundê Indigenous Reserve in the province of Rondônia; however, some Kwazá live in the Terra Indígena Kwazá do Rio São Pedro. In 2008 their population was 40, up from 25 in 1998.

Language
As of 2005, 25 Kwazá people spoke the Kwazá language, an unclassified language.

History
Kwazá people historically lived with the Aikanã, Kanoê, Tuparí, Sakurabiat, Salamãi, and other groups, that were culturally similar, even though their languages were not all mutually intelligible. These groups intermarried, battled with each other, and joined in festivals.

The Kwazá were forced off their traditional homelands by ranchers after the construction of BR-364 in the 1960s.

Notes

Indigenous peoples in Brazil
Indigenous peoples of the Amazon